The Singapore Open is a defunct Grand Prix and ATP Tour affiliated tennis tournament played from 1989 to 1992 and from 1996 to 1999. It was known as the Epson Singapore Super Tennis until 1992 and the Heineken Open from 1996 to 1999. It was initially played on outdoor hard courts at Kallang Tennis Centre. For the latter four editions it was an indoor event at Singapore Indoor Stadium.

Results

Men's singles

Men's doubles

See also
 WTA Singapore Open – women's tournament

References
 ATP Results Archive

 
ATP Tour
Grand Prix tennis circuit
Hard court tennis tournaments
Tennis tournaments in Singapore